Silda may refer to:

Places
Silda (Sogn og Fjordane), an island in Vågsøy municipality, Sogn og Fjordane county, Norway
Silda (Finnmark), an uninhabited island in Loppa municipality, Finnmark county, Norway
Silda, West Bengal, a village in West Bengal, India

People
Silda Wall Spitzer, the founder and chair of the board of Children for Children and former first lady of New York state

Other
Silda (moth), a synonym of the genus Eublemma of the family Erebidae
Silda camp attack, a 2010 attack in Silda, West Bengal, India
Battle of Silda, an 1810 naval battle between the United Kingdom and the Kingdom of Denmark-Norway 
Sildajazz, an annual jazz festival in Haugesund, Norway